Capillipes is a genus of fungi in the family Helotiaceae. The genus contains xx species.

References

Helotiaceae
Taxa named by Rolf Santesson